Tero Turunen (born 13 September 1967) is a Finnish freestyle skier. He competed in the men's moguls event at the 1992 Winter Olympics.

References

External links
 

1967 births
Living people
Finnish male freestyle skiers
Olympic freestyle skiers of Finland
Freestyle skiers at the 1992 Winter Olympics
People from Kuopio
Sportspeople from North Savo